Against the Tide may refer to:

  Against the Tide (film), a 1937 British drama film
  Against the Tide (TV series), a Singaporean TV series
  Against the Tide (EP), an EP by Mêlée